

The Loring R-1 or R-I was a reconnaissance aircraft and light bomber produced in Spain in the late 1920s. It was the first design by Eduardo Barron for Jorge Loring's company — Talleres Loring, and the firm's first aircraft of its own design.

Design and development
Conventional for its day, it was a biplane with staggered wings that were braced with struts in a Warren truss-like configuration. The pilot and observer sat in open cockpits in tandem and the main units of the fixed, tailskid undercarriage were divided.

Thirty examples were produced for the Aeronáutica Militar of the Spanish Army. They remained in service until December 1931 when they were phased out during the military restructuring promoted by Manuel Azaña, the newly nominated Minister of War of the republican government. Azaña's aim was to modernize the Spanish Military and cut down the expenses of the state in the aftermath of the Great Depression.

Variants
R-1 
First prototype aircraft that later went into production.
R-2 (R-II)
A refined version able to take heavier load than the R-I that was designed around 1925 before production shifted to the Loring R-3.

Operators
 (Kingdom)
Aeronáutica Militar
 (Republic)
Aeronáutica Militar

Specifications

See also

References

 

1920s Spanish military reconnaissance aircraft
Loring aircraft
Light bombers
Biplanes